Wix may refer to:

Computing
 WiX (Windows Installer XML Toolset), a software toolset
 Wix.com, an Israeli software company providing cloud-based web development services

Places
 Wix, Essex, United Kingdom
 Vicques, Switzerland, formerly

Other uses
 Wix (name), a given name and surname
 Wix Wickens or Wix (Paul Wickens, born 1956), keyboardist

See also
 Wicks (disambiguation)
 Wickes (disambiguation)
 Wicks (surname)